Jesús María Ramón Valdés (15 March 1938 – 7 January 2016) was a Mexican politician affiliated with the PRI. As of 2013 he served as Senator of the LX and LXI Legislatures of the Mexican Congress representing Coahuila. He also served as Deputy in the LIX Legislature and as municipal president of Ciudad Acuña.

References

1938 births
2016 deaths
People from Acuña, Coahuila
Members of the Senate of the Republic (Mexico)
Members of the Chamber of Deputies (Mexico)
Institutional Revolutionary Party politicians
Politicians from Coahuila
20th-century Mexican politicians
21st-century Mexican politicians
Municipal presidents in Coahuila
Monterrey Institute of Technology and Higher Education alumni